Wilter Wee Palma II, also known as Sharky Palma, is a Filipino politician from the province of Zamboanga Sibugay. He is served as a Member of the Philippine House of Representatives representing the First District of Zamboanga Sibugay from 2016 to 2022. He is the son of incumbent Representative Wilter Palma.

Political career
Palma was first elected to Congress in 2016, and was reelected in 2019. Although eligible for a third mandate, Palma opted to run for governor to replace his father, Wilter Palma. He was defeated by fellow Zamboanga Sibugay representative Dulce Ann Hofer.

References

Living people
1982 births
Politicians from Zamboanga Sibugay
Lakas–CMD (1991) politicians